Butcher Hill is a 1989 video game.

Butcher Hill or Butchers Hill may also refer to:

Butchers Hill, Baltimore, a neighborhood of Baltimore, Maryland
Butcher Hill (West Virginia), a summit in Wood County, West Virginia
Butcher Hill Historic District, a historic district in Randolph County, West Virginia
Butcher Hill, running between Hawksworth and West Park in Leeds, England
Butcher Hills, a range in Montana